Coleophora okuella is a moth of the family Coleophoridae that is endemic to Japan.

References

External links

okuella
Moths described in 2002
Endemic fauna of Japan
Moths of Japan